Andry Laffita Fernández (born March 26, 1978) is a retired Cuban amateur boxer. He won the silver medal at the 2005 World Amateur Boxing Championships. At the 2008 Olympic Games in Beijing, he won a silver medal in the flyweight class.

Career
In 1996 Laffita won the world junior championship. From 1999 to 2001 he was suspended for use of steroids.

Laffita rose to prominence after Olympic champion Yuriorkis Gamboa moved out of his weight class. During the 2005 World Amateur Boxing Championships in Mianyang, China Laffita defeated Somjit Jongjohor, Violito Payla, Juan Carlos Payano, Jérôme Thomas and Mirat Sarsembayev to reach the final. He lost to Lee Ok-Sung, winning the silver medal.

In 2006 and 2007 he was beaten by compatriot Yoandri Salinas in the national championships. After Salinas moved up in weight class, Laffita finally claimed the championship in 2008 vs Alexei Collado.

Laffita beat Braulio Ávila by a razor-thin countback decision in the semifinals of the regional qualifying tournament in 2008. He lost to Juan Carlos Payano in the final, although both had already qualified for the Games. At the 2008 Summer Olympics, Laffita won the silver medal, losing in the final to Thai boxer Somjit Jongjohor.

World Amateur Championships
 2005 (as a flyweight)
Defeated Somjit Jongjohor (Thailand) 16-14
Defeated Jérôme Thomas (France) 29-15
Defeated Violito Payla (Philippines) RSCO
Defeated Juan Carlos Payano (Dominican Republic) 31-22
Defeated Mirat Sarsembayev (Kazakhstan) 29-16
Lost to Lee Ok-Sung (South Korea) 22-33 (final match)

World Cup
 2005 (as a flyweight)
Lost to Somjit Jongjohor (Thailand) 24–+24
Lost to Mirzhan Rakhimzhanov (Kazakhstan) 28–40
Defeated Georgy Balakshin (Russia) 36–22

Olympic Games
 2008 (as a flyweight)
1st round bye
Defeated Khalid Yafai (Great Britain) 9-3
Defeated McWilliams Arroyo (Puerto Rico) 11-2
Defeated Georgy Balakshin (Russia) 9-8
Lost to Somjit Jongjohor 2-8 (final match)

References
 2005 results
 Amateur record (Archived 2009-10-25)
 

1978 births
Living people
Flyweight boxers
Boxers at the 2008 Summer Olympics
Olympic boxers of Cuba
Olympic silver medalists for Cuba
Olympic medalists in boxing
Cuban people of Spanish descent
Medalists at the 2008 Summer Olympics
Cuban male boxers
AIBA World Boxing Championships medalists
People from Pinar del Río
21st-century Cuban people